USRC Rush may refer to several revenue cutters of the United States Revenue-Marine (1790–1894) and United States Revenue Cutter Service (1894-1915):

 , launched in 1827 and sold in 1833
 , in commission from 1831 to 1840
 , in commission from 1874 to 1885
 , in commission from 1885 to 1912

See also
 , a United States Coast Guard high endurance cutter
 , a United States Coast Guard medium endurance cutter
 , ships of the United States Navy

Ship names